New York Rock is an off-Broadway musical by avant-garde artist Yoko Ono. It is a fictionalised account of her marriage to songwriter and Beatle John Lennon. The musical contains many songs from Ono's albums throughout the years, as well as several new tracks, "Warzone" and "Where Do We Go from Here", which were reworked for inclusion on Rising.

Track listing
All songs written by Yoko Ono.
 "It Happened" (Mother) – 1:26
 "I'll Always Be with You" [*] – 2:27
 "Spec of Dust" – 2:09
 "Midsummer New York" – 1:58
 "What a Bastard the World Is" – 3:19
 "Loneliness" – 3:09
 "Give Me Something" – 1:21
 "Light on the Other Side" [*] – 1:58
 "Tomorrow May Never Come" – 1:54
 "Don't Be Scared" – 3:14
 "Growing Pain" – 2:37
 "Warzone" [*] – 1:41
 "Never Say Goodbye" – 4:17
 "O'Sanity" – 2:19
 "I Want My Love to Rest Tonight" – 4:15
 "I Felt Like Smashing My Face in a Clear Glass Window" – 3:04
 "Now or Never" – 3:20
 "We're All Water" – 3:04
 "Yes I'm Your Angel" – 2:44
 "It Happened" (Jill) – 1:28
 "Where Do We Go from Here" [*] – 2:02
 "Sleepless Night" – 2:00
 "No, No, No" – 1:34
 "Even When You're Far Away" – 3:02
 "Hell in Paradise" – 2:47
 "Toyboat" – 2:59
 "Story of an Oak Tree" [*] – 2:18
 "Goodbye Sadness" – 4:10
 "Never Say Goodbye" (Bill) [hidden track] – 4:23

([*] = new track)

Cast
 Mother – Jan Horvarth
 Little Bill/Boy – Sean Dooley
 Bill – Pat McRoberts
 Jill – Lynette Perry
 Ignorance – Pete Herber
 Violence – Walter O'Neil
 Violence II – Paul Mahos
 Streetkid – Aaron Blackshear
 Streetkid – Peter Kim
 Streetkid- Evan Ferrante

Singles
 "Never Say Goodbye" (CD)

Songs not on the CD
 "It Happened" (Bill)
 "If Only" (Jill)

References

Yoko Ono albums
1994 albums
Capitol Records albums